Hormasji "Homi" Maneckji Seervai (1906–1996) was an Indian jurist, lawyer and writer. He is also considered to be a renowned Constitutional expert, and his works are cited popularly in various Indian cases as well as journals.

Early life and education
Seervai was born on 5 December 1906 in Bombay (present-day Mumbai) in a middle class Parsi family. He matriculated from
Bhada New High School, Mumbai and in 1922 joined Elphinstone College, Bombay from where he graduated with a first class degree in
philosophy. He received his law degree from Government Law College, Mumbai.

As a lawyer
Seervai was called to the bar in 1929. In 1932, he joined the Chambers of Sir Jamshedji Behramji Kanga. Seervai served as Advocate General of Bombay from 1957 to 1960 and Maharashtra from 1960 until his resignation in 1974. During those years, he was offered various other positions in the Indian judicial system, including a seat on the Indian Supreme Court and as Attorney General for India. He declined these positions preferring to contribute through critical analysis of higher court judgements. He had an effortless command of the English language and its classics.

His first chance in the Supreme Court of India arose in a defence of the Government of Bombay's decision to ban prize competitions, in
the nature of lotteries. Seervai's argument was rewarded with spectacular success. The judgments and orders of the Bombay courts were unanimously set aside with costs.

Those who are familiar with the legal profession know that his 3 volume work on Constitutional Law is the finest work on the subject and if an Indian advocate is well versed in it, he is automatically considered worthy of respect. Seervai was a man above all dedicated to truth and justice. This is precisely why he earned the respect of his colleagues, clients and readers alike.

Simplicity

In many respects, Seervai, the man, was greater than Seervai, the lawyer, but the two characters were inextricably mixed, making him the most respected person in law and giving him that indefinable eminence over several lawyers of his day who were reputed to be clever and more astute than he was.

Achievements and awards
Seervai is best known for his 1967 analysis, the Constitutional Law of India – a Critical Commentary. This work contributed significantly to Kesavananda Bharati vs. The State of Kerala (1973), his most famous case, which led to the development of the "Basic structure doctrine", which inhibits politically motivated changes to the Constitution of India. Perhaps, its full repercussions have not yet completely been understood, and it is the defining and distinguishing part of democracy under the written constitution vs. the British model. The decision established that a legislature, elected for the legislative process, does not have the ability to amend the basic structure of the constitution.
That in itself indicates a departure from the British Westminster democracy, where the unwritten constitution can be amended at will by the British parliament, which is the ultimate sovereign. The Indian Parliament, however, cannot change the basic structure of the Indian constitution and the same principle is championed in later cases by the Supreme Court of India. Seervai's impact on defining the limits of parliamentary sovereignty and in declaring the constitution supreme has been great for the entire subcontinent and today it has become an accepted principle that has been upheld by the Supreme Court of Pakistan as well.

Recognition of his eminence came in many ways. He was offered judgeship of the Supreme Court twice. Each time he declined it. He was conferred the Padma Vibhushan in 1972. In 1981, the British Academy elected Seervai its Corresponding Fellow, a distinction reserved for scholars of the highest academic distinction. Also in 1981, he was awarded the Dadabhai Naoroji Prize. In 1982, Seervai was elected Honorary Fellow of the Asiatic Society of Bombay. The International Bar Association recognised him as a "Living Legend of Law" in 1994. Lord Denning, the doyen of all judges said, "He was a great personality and one of the most learned I have met." However, the most fining recognition of his eminence was the Government of India's offer to appoint him the Attorney-General for India in 1971. Declining the office with thanks, he wrote in his own hand to the Law Minister that the best contribution that he could make to the law was not to appear in Court but to "embody in successive editions of his book the correct judicial interpretation of the Constitution". One cannot think of any lawyer in the world declining such a high office for the sake of writing a scholarly thesis.

His most seminal moment was in the Parliamentary Privileges Case (In Re: Keshav Singh), where Seervai, appearing for the U.P. Legislature.

His controversial Partition of India: Legend and Reality (1989) challenged the existing view that blamed the partition of India on M A Jinnah and the Muslim League. He argued that it was the latent bias on the part of Indian National Congress leadership which resulted in partition. It is a painstakingly accurate exercise of sifting through the Transfer of Power Papers, apart from dozens of other books on the subject of Partition, after which like a true jurist, Mr. Seervai has given his verdict and it is an interesting verdict but also a journey towards discovering the truth. The journey, Seervai says, started for Rajmohan Gandhi with his fascinating inquiry into the life of Mahomed Ali Jinnah in which the author did not shy away from criticising his famous grandfather, Mohandas Gandhi, for introducing religion into politics and for refusing to accommodate the Muslims to share power. Rajmohan Gandhi's thesis was considerably developed by Seervai, whose in-depth research and study on the subject came to the conclusion that Congress, rather than Jinnah, was primarily responsible for Partition by not accepting parity for Hindus and Muslims and other safeguards for Muslim interests.

Books on Seervai
 
"The Seervai Legacy"

Books by Seervai
"Constitutional Law of India, Vol.3, 4th Edition"
"The Emergency, Future Safeguards & the Habeas Corpus Case: A Criticism"
"The Position of the Judiciary under the Constitution of India".
"Partition of India: Legend and Reality" (this monologue was included in the fourth edition of Seervai's monumental "Constitutional Law of India")

References

1906 births
1996 deaths
Indian barristers
Scholars from Mumbai
Recipients of the Padma Vibhushan in literature & education
Parsi people from Mumbai
Advocates General for Indian states
20th-century Indian lawyers
Corresponding Fellows of the British Academy